Christopher Geoffrey Wright (born 7 May 1988) is an Australian swimmer.  He competed for Australia at the 2012 Summer Olympics in the 100 and 200 m butterfly. At the 2014 Commonwealth Games, he competed in the 50 and 100 m butterfly and the men's  relay.

He is married to fellow Australian Olympic swimmer Melanie Schlanger.

References

External links
 
 
 
 
 
 
 
 
 

1988 births
Living people
Australian male butterfly swimmers
Australian male freestyle swimmers
Swimmers at the 2012 Summer Olympics
Olympic swimmers of Australia
Commonwealth Games competitors for Australia
Swimmers at the 2014 Commonwealth Games
21st-century Australian people